Fındıkpınarı is a town in Mersin Province, Turkey.

Fındıkpınarı is in Mezitli ilçe (district),  of Greater Mersin. Situated among pine forests it is a popular summer resort. (Mountain resort towns are usually called yayla) Traditionally, people from Mersin used to spend their summer vacations in Fındıkpınarı. Although the yayla tradition is on the decline, the settled population of the town was 2818
as of 2012.

Above and east of the town is a small garrison fortress consisting of three towers and a single wall which block access to the summit of an outcrop.  The masonry and plan of this site date from the 12th or 13th century during the period of the Armenian Kingdom of Cilicia. The fortification was surveyed in 1981. Directly below the outcrop are the traces of a medieval settlement.

On 15 December 1954, Fındıkpınar was declared village  and in 1993 the village was declared township .

References 

Populated places in Mersin Province
Towns in Turkey
Yaylas in Turkey
Tourist attractions in Mersin Province
Populated places in Mezitli District